The Peary–MacMillan Arctic Museum is a museum located in Hubbard Hall at Bowdoin College in Brunswick, Maine.  Named after Arctic explorers and Bowdoin College graduates Robert E. Peary (Class of 1877) and Donald B. MacMillan (Class of 1898), it is the only museum in the lower 48 states of the United States dedicated completely to Arctic Studies.

History
Bowdoin College’s historic relationship with the Arctic dates back to 1860, when a group of Bowdoin students accompanied  professor Paul Chadbourne on a research trip to Labrador and West Greenland. Peary and MacMillan made many trips to the Arctic, together and separately. Bowdoin students also accompanied MacMillan on several expeditions in the early-to-mid-20th century.  To this day, professors and students of the college continue to travel to the Arctic to pursue research.

The Peary–MacMillan Arctic Museum was made possible by generous donations from the Class of 1925, George B. Knox (Class of 1929), and other alumni and friends.  The Museum was dedicated in June 1967, with both MacMillan and Peary's daughter, Marie Ahnighito Peary, in attendance.

Established in 1985, the Arctic Studies Center links the resources of the museum and the library with teaching and research efforts, and hosts lectures, workshops, and educational outreach projects. "Through course offerings, field research programs, employment opportunities, and special events, the Arctic Studies Center promotes anthropological, archaeological, geological, and environmental investigations of the North."

Exhibitions
The Arctic Museum's exhibitions focus on different aspects of the Arctic, ranging from natural life, such as plants and animals, to cultural life of people native to the Arctic region.  Artifacts in the Museum's collection include Peary and MacMillan's expedition equipment, anthropological objects, Inuit art, films, archival papers, publications, and natural history specimens.  The Museum's exhibitions  change regularly. To see current exhibits visit the museum's website.

Academic program
Bowdoin College's Departments of Sociology, Anthropology, and Geology offer a concentration in Arctic Studies. These departments, together with the Peary–MacMillan Arctic Museum, provide students with opportunities to explore cultural, social, and environmental issues involving Arctic lands and peoples. The Director of the Peary–MacMillan Arctic Museum & Arctic Studies Center is Susan A. Kaplan, Professor of Anthropology.

Visiting
The Peary–MacMillan Arctic Museum is open Tuesday – Saturday from 10:00 am to 5:00 pm, and on Sundays from 2:00 pm – 5:00 pm. The Museum is closed on Mondays and on national holidays. 
Admission is free, and donations are accepted. School and group tours may be arranged.

Collection highlights

See also
 Jensen Arctic Museum
 List of museums in Alaska
 List of museums (section Norway)

References

External links
Peary–MacMillan Arctic Museum – official site
An Expedition to Cape Sheridan – Follow Arctic Museum Director Susan Kaplan and Curator Genevieve LeMoine as they blog about their archaeological research at Cape Sheridan, Ellesmere Island, Nunavut, Summer 2011
A Glimmer on the Polar Sea – A blog documenting research on the Crocker Land Expedition from 1913-1917, including research on museum collections, at other archives, and at Etah, where the expedition was based.
Bowdoin College – official site

Museums in Cumberland County, Maine
Art museums and galleries in Maine
Inuit culture
Anthropology museums in the United States
University museums in Maine
Buildings and structures in Brunswick, Maine
Tourist attractions in Brunswick, Maine
Museums established in 1967
1967 establishments in Maine
Bowdoin College